Got It? is the debut extended play by South Korean boy band Got7. It was released on January 20, 2014. The song "Girls Girls Girls" was the promoted single.

Track listing 
Credits adapted from Korea Music Copyright Association's database.

Chart performance

Album chart

Sales

Singles

Girls Girls Girls

Other charted songs

References

External links 
 

2014 debut EPs
Dance-pop EPs
Korean-language EPs
JYP Entertainment EPs
Genie Music EPs
Got7 EPs